Jadavpur University is a public state  autonomous research university located in Jadavpur, Kolkata, West Bengal, India. It was established in 1905 as Bengal Technical Institute and was converted into Jadavpur University in 1955. In 2022, it was ranked fourth among universities in India by the National Institutional Ranking Framework (NIRF). It also achieved 11th rank in the engineering category and 12th rank overall in National Institutional Ranking Framework (NIRF) 2022.

History
In 1910, the Society for the Promotion of Technical Education in Bengal which looked after Bengal Technical Institute (which later became College of Engineering and Technology, Bengal) was amalgamated to NCE. NCE henceforth looked after the College of Engineering and Technology, Bengal.

After Independence, on 24 December 1955, Jadavpur University was officially established by the Government of West Bengal with the concurrence of the Government of India.

Campus
Jadavpur University is semi-residential, which at present operates out of two urban campuses: one in Jadavpur and another in Salt Lake.

Salt Lake Campus 
With addition of newer departments and expansion of older ones, Jadavpur University had to start its extended campus in Salt Lake, Kolkata.
Jadavpur University Salt Lake Campus (also known as "SL Campus") hosts five engineering departments namely Information Technology, Instrumentation and Electronics Engineering, Power Engineering, Printing Engineering and Construction Engineering.

All five departments together hosts the Freshers Party known as CIIPPUS. Also, SRIJAN, the annual Tech-Fest of JU (which is also the second significant event after SANSKRITI) is organised in this campus.

This campus also has the famous Jadavpur University-Cricket Association of Bengal ground (known as CAB ground).

National Instruments Limited Campus 
Jadavpur University has acquired the erstwhile National Instruments Limited (CSIR), becoming the first Indian university to acquire such a research unit. It is on a nine-acre plot opposite the main campus. After renovation, the new campus is expected to add much-needed space for new laboratories especially for the Departments of Electrical Engineering, Electronics and Telecommunication Engineering, and Computer Science & Engineering. The NIL campus is to be connected to the main campus by an underground tunnel to bypass the traffic on the busy Raja S.C. Mullick Road.

Organisation and administration

Governance
The Vice-chancellor of Jadavpur University is the chief executive officer of the university. Suranjan Das is the current vice-chancellor of Jadavpur University.

Faculties
The departments of Jadavpur University are divided into four faculties councils.
1. Faculty of Arts
2. Faculty of Science
3. Faculty of Engineering & Technology
4. I.S.L.M.

Affiliated institutes

In addition to being a unitary university, it has other institutes like the J D Birla Institute, and the Institute of Business Management affiliated to it, which operate out of independent campuses. While these institutes have their own independent curriculum as well as examination systems, the final degree is offered by Jadavpur University.

To facilitate interdisciplinary learning and research in diverse fields, there are a number of schools and centre for studies. Some of the major research ventures undertaken by these schools include the pioneering work done by the School of Environmental Studies in highlighting the presence of arsenic in groundwater in countries like India and Bangladesh and the development of the first alcohol based car by the School of Automobile Engineering.

The centres for studies are usually directly associated with a particular department in Jadavpur University

In March 2011, Indian American scientist Manick Sorcar assisted in the opening of a laser animation lab under the School of Illumination Science, Engineering and Design.

Academics

Rankings

Internationally, Jadavpur University was ranked 701-750 in the QS World University Rankings of 2023 and 182 in Asia. It was ranked 1001–1200 in the world by the Times Higher Education World University Rankings of 2023, 251–300 in Asia in 2022 and in the same band among emerging economies.

The National Institutional Ranking Framework ranked it 4th among universities in India, 11th among engineering institutes, and 12th overall in 2022.

Publishing 
The university press publishes all documents of record in the university including PhD theses, question papers and journals. On 26 October 2010 the institution announced plans to launch a publication house, named Jadavpur University Press. The main focus of the publication house will be to publish textbooks and thesis written by research scholars and authors from all universities. The first two titles of JUP were launched on 1 February 2012 at the Calcutta Book Fair. The two titles were Rajpurush (translation of Niccolò Machiavelli's Il Principe); translated by Doyeeta Majumder, with an introduction by Swapan Kumar Chakravorty, and Shilpachinta (translation of selections from Leonardo da Vinci's notebooks); translated by Sukanta Chaudhuri. Both books were translated from the original Italian.

Notable alumni

Criticism and controversies 

In 2014 a series of protests broke out in response to the alleged molestation of a female student and beating of a male student by 10 other students on 28 August 2014. Her family and ultimately the student body were unsatisfied by the response of the Vice Chancellor to the allegations. Protests began on 10 September. On 16 September students gheraoed several officials in their offices, demanding that the Vice Chancellor make a statement on the status of a fair probe. Police were summoned, and later that night the police allegedly attacked and beat the student demonstrators. 30 to 40 students were injured; some had to be hospitalized. Reaction was nationwide, with supportive protests at multiple other cities including New Delhi, Hyderabad and Bangalore. On 20 September, Governor Keshari Nath Tripathi, who is also the chancellor of the university, met with student representatives and promised to conduct an impartial inquiry. However, students said they will continue to boycott classes until the Vice Chancellor resigns.

On 26 September, a State Government inquiry panel submitted its report, confirming that the female student had indeed been sexually abused on 28 August 2014. On 26 September, police summoned two Jadavpur University students to come to the Lalbazar Police HQ for questioning at 4 pm on Friday. They were arrested at 6 pm. "The arrests were made after evidence was found, prima facie, against the duo. Further investigation is on," said joint CP-crime Pallab Kanti Ghosh. Mr Ghosh also stated, "(Two names) were arrested because we had enough evidence to prove that they were present at the spot and had carried out the crime as alleged in the victim's complaint." The duo were booked under Sections of 354 (assault or use of criminal force on a woman with the intent to outrage her modesty), 342 (wrongful confinement), 323 (voluntarily causing hurt) and 114 (abettor present when offence is committed) of the IPC.

JU got embroiled in controversy on July 4, 2018, when the executive council announced its decision to scrap entrance tests for six humanities subjects which was met with protests from the Jadavpur University Teacher's Association and the student unions along with other academics and university students due speculations that state education ministry had influenced this decision.

See also

 List of universities in India
 Universities and colleges in India

References

External links

 

 
20th century in Kolkata
Academic institutions associated with the Bengal Renaissance
Educational institutions established in 1955
1955 establishments in West Bengal
Engineering colleges in India by state or union territory